MLA is a 2018 Indian Kannada-language comedy-drama film written and directed by Mourya Manjunath. The film stars Pratham and Sonal Monteiro. The film is jointly produced by Venkatesh Reddy and Venki Palugulla under the banner of Triveni 24 Crafts. Krishna Sarathi is behind the camera while Vikram Subramanya has scored and composed music.

Synopsis 

MLA is a satirical comedy drama showcasing the present political scenario. As the abbreviation (Mother Promise Lekkasigada Aasami) tells the protagonist is a happy go lucky guy until just before the interval block, he gets a chance to become MLA. Now his life completely changes & the legislature drama unfolds with a humor touch.

Cast
Pratham (Olle Huduga Pratham)
Sonal Monteiro
Kuri Prathap
Sparsha Rekha
Chandrakala Mohan
Navarasa Ramakrishna
Naveen Padil
Victory Vasu

Production and release 
MLC turned actor HM Revanna plays the Chief Minister role in the film. Speaking to media, the former minister quoted”I loved playing the role of Chief Minister for few minutes, and it felt good that I will be on silver screen. The director and producer have good experience in the industry, and with Pratham playing the lead role, MLA will attract large audience."MLA was released on 9 November 2018.

Soundtrack
The film's music was launched by Darshan in the presence of Sara Govindu (Chairman - Karnataka Film Chamber). The film's score and soundtrack is composed by Vikram Subramanya

References

External links

MLA on Facebook

2018 films
2010s Kannada-language films
Indian comedy-drama films
2018 comedy-drama films
Indian satirical films